Associação Esportiva Santacruzense, more commonly referred to as Santacruzense, is a Brazilian football club based in Santa Cruz do Rio Pardo, São Paulo.

History
The club was founded on January 25, 1931, by a group of local amateur athletes, professionalizing in 1954. They won the Campeonato Paulista Série A3 in 1962.

Achievements

 Campeonato Paulista Série A3:
 Winners (1): 1962

Stadium
Associação Esportiva Santacruzense play their home games at Estádio Municipal Leônidas Camarinha. The stadium has a maximum capacity of 15,000 people.

References

Association football clubs established in 1931
Football clubs in São Paulo (state)
1931 establishments in Brazil